Eliezer 'Leon' Ehrenpreis (May 22, 1930 – August 16, 2010, Brooklyn) was a mathematician at Temple University who proved the Malgrange–Ehrenpreis theorem, the fundamental theorem about differential operators with constant coefficients. He previously held tenured positions at Yeshiva University and at the Courant Institute at New York University.

Early life and education
Leon was born in New York City to a family of Jewish immigrants from Eastern Europe. He graduated from Stuyvesant High School and studied Mathematics as an undergraduate at City College of New York. Afterward, he enrolled as a doctoral student at Columbia University where he studied under mathematician Claude Chevalley, obtaining his PhD in 1953 at the age of 23. His doctoral thesis was entitled "Theory of Distributions in Locally Compact Spaces".

Religion
Ehrenpreis was also a Rabbi, having received his ordination from the renowned Rabbi Moshe Feinstein. He was the author of a work on the Chumash and other religious topics, currently in manuscript.

Miscellaneous
Ehrenpreis ran the New York City Marathon every year from its inception until 2007.

Publications

See also 
Ehrenpreis's fundamental principle
Ehrenpreis conjecture

References

"One thing you can count on is this math prof on the run", Temple Times, November 7, 2002 Volume 33 Number 10  (retrieved August 17, 2010)

External links

2010 deaths
1930 births
20th-century American mathematicians
21st-century American mathematicians
Jewish scientists
Temple University faculty
People from Brooklyn
Mathematicians from New York (state)
Columbia Graduate School of Arts and Sciences alumni
Stuyvesant High School alumni